Bastilla euryleuca is a moth of the family Noctuidae first described by Prout in 1919. It is endemic to Borneo.

References

External links

Bastilla (moth)
Moths described in 1919